Damnak Chang'aeur (UNGEGN: Dâmnăk Châng'aeur ) is a district (srok) in Kep Province, Cambodia. It is the largest district in the province and a train track from Phnom Penh to Sihanoukville runs through here. The district is subdivided into three communes (khum) and 11 villages (phum).

History 

In June 1994, Phnom Voar in Damnak Chang'aeur hit the international headlines as the site of the kidnapping of three westerners, Australian David Wilson, 29, Briton Mark Slater, 28, and Frenchman Jean-Michel Braquet, 27 from a train by Khmer Rouge forces led by Commander Chouk Rin.

Subdivisions

 230101 អង្កោល Angkoul Commune: It is at the west, bordering Kampot at its west, the sea at its south and Kep Municipality at its east.  
 23010101 អំពេង  Ampeng
 23010102 ទួលស្រង Tuol Srang
 23010103 កោះសោម Kaoh Saom
 23010104 អង្កោល Angkoul
 230102 អូរក្រសារ Ou Krasar Commune
 23010201 អូរក្រសារ Ou Krasar
 23010202 ដំណាក់ចំបក់ Damnak Chambak
 230103 ពងទឹក Pong Toek Commune
 23010301 អូរដូង Ou Doung
 23010302 ព្រៃតាកុយ Prey Ta Koy
 23010303 ភ្នំលាវ Phnom Leav
 23010304 រនេស Rones
 23010305 ចំការបី Chamkar Bei

References 

Districts of Kep province